Peter Mackenzie (born January 19, 1961) is an American actor.

Career
He co-starred in films Good Morning, Vietnam (1987), Torch Song Trilogy (1988), Lorenzo's Oil (1992) and Trumbo (2015). He is also known for his television roles on Herman's Head (1991–1994), ER (2002), Criminal Minds (2005), Gilmore Girls (2006), Grey's Anatomy (2009), How I Met Your Mother (2011) and Black-ish (2014–).

In 2014, Mackenzie installed a small curbside book exchange on public land near his home which he called "The Tenn-Mann Library". Popular in the neighborhood, it was cited for a local ordinance violation after an anonymous complaint.

Personal life 
Mackenzie's brother, Douglas S. Cook, died in 2015.

Filmography

Film

Television

References

External links
 

1961 births
20th-century American male actors
21st-century American male actors
American male film actors
American male television actors
Living people
Male actors from Boston